William Herskovic (June 1914 – March 3, 2006) was a Holocaust survivor and humanitarian. His escape from Auschwitz in 1942 and early eyewitness testimony inspired Belgium's opposition to Nazi Germany during World War II, and alerted the Resistance to the atrocities that were taking place in the concentration camps. Because of Herskovic's escape and testimony, hundreds of lives were saved.

Herskovic is also the founder of Bel Air Camera, a veritable landmark in Los Angeles, which he established in 1957, and has received numerable awards for his philanthropy.

Early life
Herskovic was born in June 1914 in what was then Hungary.

His mother died when he was only 6 months old, and his father had many children by a second wife, so he was raised mainly by his maternal grandparents.

Herskovic, who spoke 9 languages, dropped out of school at the age of 13 in order to take his brother's place as a photographer's apprentice. By the age of 15 he was running photo studios across Czechoslovakia and winning awards as an artist for his skill in photographic retouching.

By the age of 17, he had started his own photo studio, Studio Willy, that quickly gained fame across Belgium.

He married his first wife, Esther, and they had two girls—Giselle (Katie) Herskovic, born in 1938, and Germaine Herskovic, born in 1941.

Holocaust experiences
Herskovic's businesses were confiscated by the Germans and he, his wife and their two baby girls were sent to a concentration camp. Allthough he wouldn't find out until a long time later, his wife and two daughters were killed in a gas chamber almost immediately upon their arrival.

Herskovic was sent to an Auschwitz hard labor camp where he wasn't expected to live long on about 130 calories a day.

Herskovic set about planning an escape, and on the first night of Hanukkah, 1942, Herskovic and two others dug a pair of wire cutters out from beneath layers of snow where they had hidden them, and cut through chain-link fences during a blizzard.

The three ran through the snow for hours towards freedom.

Herskovic then warned the Belgian underground of what was going on in the camps. "Do not go peacefully, they are killing us by the hundreds," he is quoted as saying in Escape to Life: A Journey Through the Holocaust, his biography.

The resistance quickly mobilized, stopping a transport train and rescuing hundreds bound for the camps.

"His survival saved hundreds," according to a Simon Wiesenthal Center tribute.

Herskovic then went undercover, carefully crafting false papers and getting a job camouflaging the beaches of Normandy, where he was in fact observing military installations and drawing sketches to send back to the resistance.

After the war

Herskovic, discovering that his wife and children had been killed, asked his first wife's younger sister, Maria, for her hand in marriage (her husband had also been killed in the Holocaust). She accepted.

They had three children, all girls, and moved to America. In Los Angeles, Herskovic founded Bel Air Camera in 1957 in Westwood Village, which is still a family-owned business to this day.

From the moment he immigrated to the U.S. with his wife, Mireille, they began their heartfelt dedication to philanthropy, contributing to communities whenever possible. With an understandable commitment to his history, he was a founding supporter of the U.S. Holocaust Museum in Washington, D.C. where a plaque proudly commemorates, and hopefully puts to rest, all the beloved family he lost who were never given the benefit of gravestones. He was also dedicated to the Simon Wiesenthal Museum of Tolerance in hopes, "that education and awareness will prevent prejudice and hatred in the future." Additionally, he and his wife have been loyal supporters of numerous organizations including: UJF, ADL, Friends of Sheba Medical Center, Friends of Israel Disabled Veterans, Technion, UCLA's Hillel, Milken Community High School, Stephen S. Wise Temple, The Jesters (a charity helping blind children), Israel Cancer Research Fund, and others.

Awards
Throughout his life, Herskovic received numerous awards for his heroic and philanthropic work. Most recently, he was given the Humanitarian Award by the Israel Cancer Research Fund.

Death
William Herskovic died on March 3, 2006, at his home in Encino, CA after a long battle with prostate cancer. He was 91. Herskovic is survived by his wife, Maria, their three children, four grandchildren and great-grandchild.

External links
HerskovicFoundation.org
Bel Air Camera
From The Times of London: Photographer who spent the war on the run from the Holocaust and survived it to find prosperity in America
AP  obituary via Washington Post: William Herskovic, Witness to Holocaust
Archived Excerpt of the Los Angeles Times obituary: William Herskovic, 91; Bel Air Camera Founder Escaped Auschwitz, Fueled Belgian Resistance
European Jewish Press obituary: Auschwitz escapee Herskovic dies at 91
CBS 2 video clip: Bel Air Camera Founder, Holocaust Survivor Dies

1914 births
2006 deaths
Deaths from prostate cancer
Hungarian Jews
Hungarian emigrants to the United States
American people of Hungarian-Jewish descent
Deaths from cancer in California
Belgian resistance members
Jewish escapees from Nazi concentration camps
Escapees from Auschwitz